The 2008 BWF World Junior Championships took place in Pune, India, from 29 October to 2 November 2008.

Medalists

Team competition
A total of 21 countries competed at the team competition in 2008 BWF World Junior Championships.

Final positions

Results

Final round

Individual competition

Boys Singles

Seeded

  Gao Huan (final)
  Park Sung-min (quarter-final)
  Wang Zhengming (champion)
  Tanongsak Saensomboonsuk (quarter-final)
  Lee Dong-keun (semi-final)
  Iskandar Zulkarnain Zainuddin (quarter-final)
  Emil Holst (fourth round)
  R. M. V. Gurusaidutt (semi-final)
  Kasper Lehikoinen (second round)
  Rei Sato (fourth round)
  Hsu Jen-hao (fourth round)
  Adi Pratama (quarter-final)
  Steffen Rasmussen (third round)
  Pedro Martins (fourth round)
  Syawal Ismail (fourth round)
  Wong Wing Ki (fourth round)

Finals

Top half

Section 1

Section 2

Section 3

Section 4

Bottom half

Section 5

Section 6

Section 7

Section 8

Girls Singles

Seeded

  Saina Nehwal (champion)
  Li Xuerui (fourth round)
  Wang Shixian (semi-final)
  Bae Youn-joo (quarter-final)
  Sung Ji-hyun (fourth round)
  Anne Hald Jensen (fourth round)
  Chen Xiaojia (fourth round)
  Porntip Buranaprasertsuk (semi-final)
  Sapsiree Taerattanachai (second round)
  Eriko Tamaki (fourth round)
  Sayaka Sato (final)
  Hung Shih-han (fourth round)
  Febby Angguni (second round)
  Jessica Jonggowisastro (third round)
  Michelle Li (third round)
  Chan Tsz Ka (third round)

Finals

Top half

Section 1

Section 2

Section 3

Section 4

Bottom half

Section 5

Section 6

Section 7

Section 8

Boys Doubles

Seeded

  Mak Hee Chun / Teo Kok Siang (champion)
  Choi Young-woo / Kim Gi-jung (third round)
  Kim Dae-eun / Kim Ki-eung (semi-final)
  Chai Biao / Qiu Zihan (final)
  Li Gen / Zhang Nan (quarter-final)
  Jacco Arends / Jelle Maas (third round)
  Sylvain Grosjean /  Sam Magee (second round)
  Martin Campbell / Angus Gilmour (third round)

Finals

Section 1

Section 2

Section 3

Section 4

Girls Doubles

Seeded

  Xie Jing / Zhong Qianxin (final)
  Lu Lu / Xia Huan (semi-final)
  Chiang Kai-hsin / Tien Ching-yung (third round)
  Eom Hye-won / Jung Kyung-eun (second round)
  Selena Piek / Iris Tabeling (third round)
  Franziska Burkert / Carla Nelte (third round)
  Ayaka Takahashi / Koharu Yonemoto (quarter-final)
  Chan Tsz Ka / Tse Ying Suet (quarter-final)

Finals

Section 1

Section 2

Section 3

Section 4

Mixed doubles

Seeded

  Zhang Nan / Lu Lu (final)
  Kim Gi-jung / Eom Hye-won (semi-final)
  Kim Ki-eung / Lee Se-rang (fourth round)
  'Chai Biao / Xie Jing (champion)
  Mak Hee Chun / Vivian Hoo (semi-final)  Teo Kok Siang / Sannatasah Saniru (fourth round)  Chou Tien-chen / Chiang Kai-hsin (fourth round)  Choi Young-woo / Jung Kyung-eun (quarter-final)  Lu Hsin-hao / Peng Hsiao-chu (third round)  Jacco Arends / Selena Piek (quarter-final)  Kim Dae-eun / Choi Hye-in (quarter-final)  Wong Wing Ki / Tse Ying Suet (fourth round)  Sylvain Grosjean / Marion Luttmann (second round)  Ben Stawski / Lauren Smith (fourth round)  Maneepong Jongjit / Rodjana Chuthabunditkul (fourth round)  Naomasa Senkyo / Misaki Matsutomo (third round)Finals

Top half

Section 1

Section 2

Section 3

Section 4

Bottom half

Section 5

Section 6

Section 7

Section 8

Medal table

References

External links
2008 World Junior Championships at Badminton World FederationTeam Results at Tournamentsoftware.comIndividual Results at Tournamentsoftware.com''

BWF World Junior Championships
Bwf World Junior Championships, 2008
Badminton tournaments in India
2008 in Indian sport
Sports competitions in Pune
2008 in youth sport